Pean or PEAN may refer to:

 Pean (bishop of Poznan), a 12th-century bishop of Poznan
 pean, in heraldry, a variant of the ermine fur motif
 péan, a hemostat, named after Jules-Émile Péan
 PEAN/ΠΕΑΝ, the Panhellenic Union of Fighting Youths, a Greek Resistance organization under the Axis Occupation of Greece
 PEAN, the student yearbook of the Phillips Exeter Academy

See also
 paean, a song or poem of praise or triumph
 peen (disambiguation)